Salomé – The Seventh Veil is the fourth studio album by the German Symphonic metal band Xandria, released on May 25, 2007 through Drakkar Entertainment label. The album is a concept album and is loosely based on Salomé, a Biblical character. The songs have oriental leanings supported by an extensive orchestra. This album is the last one to feature Lisa Middelhauve on vocals.

Two singles were released from the record: "Save My Life" and "Sisters of the Light". The album peaked at No.49 in German charts.

Track listing

Personnel
All information from the album booklet.

Xandria
 Lisa Middelhauve – vocals, keyboards, grunts on "Firestorm"
 Marco Heubaum – guitar, keyboards, producer
 Philip Restemeier – guitar
 Nils Middelhauve – bass, guitars
 Gerit Lamm – drums

Additional personnel
Henning Verlage – keyboards on "The Wind and the Ocean"
Mika Tauriainen – vocals on "Emotional Man" and "Only for the Stars in Your Eyes"

Production
Britta Sumkötter – artwork design
Marcus Langer – artwork design
Jörg Umbreit – engineering
Von Uslar – photography

References

External links
Album reviews on metal-archives.com
Official discography on xandria.de

2007 albums
Xandria albums
Concept albums
Cultural depictions of Salome
Drakkar Entertainment albums